Iota Sigma Pi is a national honor society in the United States. It was established in 1902 and specializes in the promotion of women in the sciences, especially chemistry. It also focuses on personal and professional growth for women in these fields. As with all honor societies, they create professional networks along with recognizing achievements of women in chemistry.

History
The society was formed during a period when women gained little recognition for their work. Therefore, women began to set up their own awards to highlight their abilities on their resumes.

The national society was formed in 1902 by Agnes Faye Morgan. She was appointed department chair of the Department of Household Science and Arts at the University of California and was one of the first to integrate chemistry into the curriculum of home economics. She continued to participate in the society throughout her professional life and had a particular focus on research. She also founded a local honour society for women in home economics named Alpha Nu.

The society goals were to encourage women to pursue chemistry academically, to "stimulate personal accomplishment in chemical fields" and to promote the academic, business and social lives of its members.

Early chapters opened at the University of Washington around 1910 and continued to spread across the country, and eventually held meetings for the American Chemical Society. In the 1930s, there was an offer of amalgamation  from the Phi Lambda Upsilon honor society for male chemists but this was refused.

Professional awards 
The highest award from the society is the National Honorary Member which is given to female chemists who have made an exceptional and significant achievement in the field. The certificate is awarded with a prize fund of USD1500. Some of the previous winners include: Marie Sklodowska-Curie, Gerti Cori and Dorothy Hodgkin.

The Violet Diller Professional Excellence Award, named after a previous member (treasurer and president), is awarded for "accomplishments in academic, governmental, or industrial chemistry, in education, in administration, or in a combination of these areas". The award consists of a certificate and USD1000 prize fund. This award was first awarded to Joan P. Lambros in 1984.

The Agnes Fay Morgan Research Award is given to women who have achieved in the field of chemistry or biochemistry.

The Centennial Award for Excellence in Undergraduate Teaching is given to those who have excelled in teaching chemistry, biochemistry or a similar subject. The nominee must spend at least 75% of their time teaching undergraduates to qualify for the certificate and USD500 award.

Student awards 

The Anna Louise Hoffman Award for Outstanding Achievement in Graduate Research is given to the nominee that has demonstrated outstanding chemical research. The nominee must also be a full-time graduate student to get the certification and US$500 reward.

There are two awards for Undergraduate Excellence in Chemistry; one must go to a first-generation student. Again, the reward is a certificate and US$500.

The Gladys Anderson Emerson Undergraduate Scholarship is funded from Emerson's estate. She wished for the funding to be given to female Iota Sigma Pi members who are undergraduates in chemistry or biochemistry. The scholarship consists of a US$2000 stipend and a certificate.

The Members-at-Large Re-entry Award is for those who have been away from academic study for over three years and then returned to degree-level chemistry. This is awarded with a US$1500 cash prize and a certificate of recognition.

Aimed at high school students, the Outstanding Young Women in Chemistry is an award given to those who demonstrate high academic ability in chemistry.

References

External links
 Iota Sigma Pi website
Iota Sigma Pi finding aid

Student organizations established in 1902
Chemistry societies
Chemistry awards
Science awards honoring women
Professional fraternities and sororities in the United States
Former members of Association of College Honor Societies
Former members of Professional Fraternity Association
1902 establishments in California